is a Japanese politician of the Liberal Democratic Party, a member of the House of Representatives in the Diet (national legislature). A native of Iwakuni, Yamaguchi and graduate of Hosei University, he was elected to the assembly of the city of Yokohama in 1999, to the assembly of Yamaguchi Prefecture in 2003, and to the House of Representatives for the first time in 2005.

References

External links 

 Official website in Japanese.

Members of the House of Representatives (Japan)
Mayors of places in Japan
Politicians from Yamaguchi Prefecture
Koizumi Children
Living people
1970 births
Liberal Democratic Party (Japan) politicians